Enno I of East Frisia, count of East Frisia (1 June 1460 – Friedeburg, 19 February 1491) was the eldest son of Ulrich I of East Frisia and Theda Ukena, of a chiefly East Frisian family.

Life 
Enno I was not particularly interested in succeeding his father as count, so his mother Theda stayed in power. Enno took part in a pilgrimage to the Holy Land, and in Jerusalem he was dubbed Knight of the Holy Sepulchre. During his absence from the county, his sister Almut fell in love with the noble Engelmann von Horstell, drost of Friedeburg. They made plans to marry, but they were prevented from marrying by Almut's mother Theda. Undeterred, Almut moved with her betrothed to Friedeburg and took the family jewels with her. When Enno returned to East Frisia, he thought his sister had been kidnapped, and he pursued the drost to his castle. As it was winter, the moat around the castle was frozen over and Enno believed he could cross it. Unfortunately, his armour was too heavy. Enno sank through the ice and drowned.

Enno I was only 30 years old when he died.  His mother Theda had a memorial shield made in his honor, which is still on display in the Great Church, today the Johannes-a-Lasco Library in Emden, on a wall close to the crypt of the Lords of East Frisia.

External links
 Biographical Dictionary of East Frisia
 Memorial shield Enno I.

1460 births
1491 deaths
Counts of East Frisia
Medieval Knights of the Holy Sepulchre